Sam Miller is an English television director.

Sam Miller may also refer to:
Sam Miller (cricketer) (born 1988), Australian cricketer
Sam Miller (journalist) (born 1962), journalist and writer
Sam J. Miller, science fiction author
Sam Miller (businessman) (1921-2019), American businessman

See also
Samuel Miller (disambiguation)
Sam Millar, crime writer